The Second Kishida Cabinet (Reshuffled) is the 101st Cabinet of Japan and was formed by Fumio Kishida, leader of the Liberal Democratic Party and Prime Minister of Japan.

The government is a coalition between the Liberal Democratic Party and the Komeito and controls both the upper and lower houses of the National Diet. It succeeded the Second Kishida Cabinet on 10 August 2022. The Reshuffled 101st Cabinet was formed following the assassination of Shinzo Abe, the former Prime Minister, which caused low approval ratings due to alleged ties to the Unification Church.

Background

Announcement
On 6 August 2022 in Hiroshima, Prime Minister Fumio Kishida announced his decision to reshuffle his second cabinet on 10 August, after attending the 77th anniversary memorial ceremony of the atomic bombings of Hiroshima and Nagasaki. The reshuffle had previously been planned for early September 2022. Kishida explained that the purpose of the reshuffle was to focus on issues like the Covid-19 pandemic, global inflation, war in Ukraine and Taiwan Strait tensions.

Shinzo Abe's assassination and the Unification Church
The reshuffle was widely reported as a response to the local criticism of ties between Kishida's Liberal Democratic Party (LDP) and the Unification Church (UC), following the assassination of the former prime minister, Shinzo Abe, on 8 July 2022. The suspected gunman revealed that his mother went bankrupt for donating most of the family's wealth and assets to the UC. Although the suspect originally planned to target the leader of the UC, Hak Ja Han, he switched to Abe because he was unable to approach Han, and he considered Abe as one of the most influential supporters of the UC. The revelation renewed local interest in the allegedly long-standing relationship between the LDP and the UC since Abe's maternal grandfather Nobusuke Kishi's tenure, as well as accusations against the UC's practices of collecting donations fraudulently, so-called "spiritual sales". Public opinions on Kishida's decision to hold a state funeral for Abe on 27 September were also divided.

According to a poll conducted by NHK from 5 to 7 August, the approval rating of Kishida's previous cabinet was 46%, down by 13% from a similar poll taken three weeks prior. Also 82% of respondents were not satisfied by the lawmakers' explanations of their ties to the UC.

Kishida's responses regarding the Unification Church
Kishida stressed that the new cabinet would have all members closely examined with regard to their relationship with the UC, but media reported that at least 30 members in the reshuffled cabinet were still related to the UC to various degrees. One of the ministers who remained in office after this reshuffle, Daishiro Yamagiwa, received media scrutiny in particular for not disclosing his ties with the UC to the public before the reshuffle, as well as his ambiguous responses when being confronted by reporters about his ties to the UC. Kishida accepted Yamagiwa's resignation on 24 October 2022 as the minister following more evidences of Yamagiwa's ties to the UC surfaced and intense criticisms from the opposition parties in the parliament for his failure to remember his participation in events held by the UC and meetings with top UC officials, including the UC leader Hak Ja Han.

After the cabinet reshuffle, a poll conducted from 20 to 21 August by Mainichi Shimbun showed that the approval rating of the new cabinet dropped to 36% by 16%, with 64% of respondents viewing the ties to the UC as a very serious problem.

Kishida promised to cut ties with the UC and help victims of manipulative sales by the UC. Taro Kono, the minister of digital affairs who was also given the special mission for consumer affairs and food safety, established a spiritual sales review committee in the Consumer Affairs Agency on 29 August. This committee initially elected 8 experts in the UC matter including former prosecutor Shiori Kanno and Masaki Kito, a lawyer representing the National Network of Lawyers Against Spiritual Sales which has been providing legal aid for victims and reporting on the anti-social issues of the UC since 1987. The committee was scheduled to hold publicly-viewable weekly online meetings. All committee members offered suggestions for strengthening regulations or enacting preventive measures against spiritual sales.

Election of the Prime Minister

List of Ministers

Cabinet 
Citation of this table: List of Second Kishida Cabinet (Reshuffled) Members

Changes 
 October 24, 2022 – Economic Revitalization Minister Daishiro Yamagiwa resigned and was replaced by Shigeyuki Goto.
 November 11, 2022 – Minister of Justice Yasuhiro Hanashi resigned and was replaced by Ken Saitō.
 November 20, 2022 – Interior Minister Minoru Terada resigned and was replaced by Takeaki Matsumoto.
 December 27, 2022 – Reconstruction Minister Kenya Akiba resigned and was replaced by Hiromichi Watanabe.

Deputy Chief Cabinet Secretary and Director-General of the Cabinet Legislation Bureau

Special Adviser to the Prime Minister

State Ministers

Parliamentary Vice-Ministers

References

External links 
Pages at the Prime Minister's Official Residence of Japan (English website):
List of Ministers November 2021 – 

Cabinet of Japan
2022 establishments in Japan
Cabinets established in 2022
2022 in Japanese politics
Kishida